Erikli is a village in the Bandırma district of Balıkesir province in Turkey.

References

Villages in Bandırma District